Sheila Bridges is an American interior designer who founded her own firm, Sheila Bridges Design, Inc., in 1994. Originally from Philadelphia, Pennsylvania, Bridges moved to New York City in 1986. She holds degrees from Brown University and Parsons School of Design, and studied decorative arts at Polimoda in Florence, Italy.

Named "America's Best Interior Designer" by CNN and Time Magazine, Bridges has designed residences and offices for many prominent entertainers, entrepreneurs and business professionals including the 8,300 square foot Harlem offices for former President Bill Clinton and his staff. Her design firm has also completed projects for rooms at Columbia University and Princeton University.

Sheila Bridges Design, Inc has been included in Gotham and New York magazine's top interior designers lists and has been featured in House Beautiful magazine's listing of the Top 100 Interior Designers in the country since 1997. Bridges is also the author of Furnishing Forward: A Practical Guide to Furnishing for a Lifetime, which was released in paperback in January 2005.  Her memoir, The Bald Mermaid, was published in 2013 and chronicles her childhood, professional life, and more recently her diagnosis of alopecia.

Along with running a successful interior design business, Bridges hosted four seasons of Sheila Bridges Designer Living for the Fine Living Network, part of the Scripps Howard cable family. The sleekly produced half-hour weekly series and award winning hour specials showcased her practical wisdom and hands-on advice. She has been a regular contributor on NBC's Today Show, has appeared on The Oprah Winfrey Show and has been profiled in numerous national and international publications including The New York Times, The Wall Street Journal, O, The Oprah Magazine, Martha Stewart Living, Ebony, Country Living, Elle Décor, Interior Design, Vanity Fair, InStyle, Essence, House & Garden, Town & Country, Traditional Home and Black Enterprise.

In 2007, Bridges' passion for interiors inspired her to design furniture and home furnishings under the name Sheila Bridges Home, Inc. Her home furnishing collections have been sold to design-conscious consumers online, through catalogs and at national retailers Anthropologie and Bed, Bath & Beyond. Bridges' Harlem Toile De Jouy wallpaper is currently available through design showrooms in The United States, Canada and Europe and is represented in the Smithsonian Cooper-Hewitt National Design Museum's permanent wallpaper collection.

Bridges lives and works in Harlem, New York.

External links
 Official site
 2013 Profile in The New York Times

References 

American interior designers
Living people
Artists from Philadelphia
American women interior designers
Year of birth missing (living people)
21st-century American women